= Heinz Altschaeffel =

German painter

Heinz Altschaeffel is a German painter.

== Biography ==
Heinz Altschaeffel was born in 1934 in Schweinfurt. After completing his studies at the Würzburg Art School in Würzburg, and furthering his education at the academies such as Munich Academy of Fine Arts in Munich and Nuremberg Academy of Fine Arts in Nuremberg, he moved back to Schweinfurt in 1964. There, he began his career as a freelance artist.

In 2011, Altschaeffel received Lower Franconian Culture Prize.

== Selected exhibitions ==
- Sparkasse Gallery
